The Gold Ghost is a 1934 short American pre-code comedy film starring Buster Keaton.

Plot
Two wealthy fathers Jim and George try to arrange their children Gloria and Wally to marry in order to strengthen their families. Gloria refuses to marry Wally dubbing him "proof that reincarnation exists because no-one could be as dumb as him in one lifetime". Wally overhears this and storms off, deciding to leave his town altogether.

He ends up in Nevada, unbeknownst to him the town he settles on is in fact a literal ghost town. Discovering a discarded sheriff's badge he declares himself the sheriff. Wally goes into a saloon and meets a beautiful girl who turns out to be a ghost. When he sees that she is being pestered by the ghosts of several rowdy former townsfolk he scares them away with his pistol. He is soon joined by former gangster Bugs Kelly who has faked his death and ended up in the same town as Wally after going on the run.

Two local prospectors discover gold buried on the outskirts of the town and this leads to renewed interest in the town and results in dozens of people showing up to begin their own search for gold including Gloria and her father. A group of gangsters shows up and tries to intimidate Wally into handing the town over to them but he refuses. Bugs Kelly, convinced that Wally doesn't have the nerve to run the town takes Wally's badge and declares himself sheriff. However he soon gives the badge back to Wally after the gangsters target him for refusing to sell and Wally and Bugs unite to run the gangsters out of town.

Cast
 Buster Keaton as Wally
 Warren Hymer as Bugs Kelly
 Dorothy Dix as Gloria
 Roger Moore (as Joe Young)
 William Worthington as Gloria's Father, Jim
 Lloyd Ingraham as Wally's Father, George
 Leo Willis
 Billy Engle as Short Miner (uncredited)
 Al Thompson as Miner (uncredited)

See also
 Buster Keaton filmography

External links

 The Gold Ghost at the International Buster Keaton Society

1934 films
1934 comedy films
1934 short films
American black-and-white films
Films directed by Buster Keaton
Films directed by Charles Lamont
Educational Pictures short films
American comedy short films
1930s American films